Gariwala (English title: The Cart) is a 2014 Bangladeshi short film written and directed by Ashraf Shishir, and starring Rokeya Prachy, Raisul Islam Asad, Masum Aziz, Imran Imu, and child artistes Maruf and Kabbo.

Funded by a Bangladesh government grant, Gariwala began as a short film before being expanded to feature length. It premiered at the Sharjah International Film Festival for Children & Youth in the United Arab Emirates on 23 October 2014. It toured extensively on the festival circuit, where its runtime was commonly described as 76 minutes. It opened in Bangladesh on 24 September 2015. It won the Bangladesh National Film Award for Best Short Film for 2014.

Cast 
 Rokeya Prachy
 Raisul Islam Asad
 Masum Aziz
 Maruf
 Kabbo
 Imran Imu
 Sansi Faruk
 R J Mukul
 Saki Farzana

Release and reception 
Gariwala premiered at the Sharjah International Film Festival for Children & Youth in the United Arab Emirates on 23 October 2014. It was shown at numerous other international film festivals including the Kolkata International Film Festival, Moondance International Film Festival, and Red Rock Film Festival. The film opened in Bangladesh on 24 September 2015.

Accolades
 Won Bangladesh National Film Award for Best Short Film for 2014 (awarded in 2016).

References 

2014 short films
Bengali-language Bangladeshi films
2010s Bengali-language films
Impress Telefilm films